Miasa is a planthopper genus in the family Dictyopharidae. Currently, seven species are identified in the genus. They are distributed in the Oriental regions of Indonesia (Borneo, Java, Sumatra), Malaysia (Borneo, Sabah, Sarawak, peninsula), China (Yunnan), Thailand, Vietnam, Singapore and Myanmar.

Species
Miasa borneensis Song, Webb & Liang, 2014
Miasa dichotoma Zheng & Chen, 2018
Miasa nigromaculata Song, Webb & Liang, 2014
Miasa producta (Lethierry, 1888)
Miasa smaragdilinea (Walker, 1857) - type species
Miasa trifoliusa Zheng & Chen, 2018
Miasa wallacei Muir, 1923

References

External links
 FLOW: Genus Miasa Distant, 1906
 

Dictyopharidae
Auchenorrhyncha genera
Hemiptera of Asia
Taxa named by William Lucas Distant